Dialane is an unstable compound of aluminium and hydrogen with formula Al2H6. Dialane is unstable in that it reacts with itself to form a polymer, aluminium hydride. Isolated molecules can be stabilised and studied in solid hydrogen.

References 

Aluminium compounds
Hydrogen compounds